Technology Tax Relief is the generic name for the programme of tax incentives implemented in the UK to incentivise companies to invest in high-value-add R&D and IP commercialisation.

History
The new approach began in 2000 with the launch of the R&D Tax Credit for small and medium enterprises.

Overview
Technology Tax Relief now encompasses the following main tax reliefs:
Research & Development Tax Credit 
Patent Box
Research and Development Capital Allowances
Research and Development Expenditure Credit 
Creative Sector Tax Reliefs including 
Video Games Tax Relief,
Animation Tax Relief, 
High-End TV Production Tax Relief,
and Film Tax Relief
The Enterprise Investment Scheme (EIS) and Seed Enterprise Investment Scheme (SEIS) give generous income and capital gains tax relief to individuals who invest in small early stage businesses.

References

See also
Research & Development Tax Credit 
Patent Box
Research and Development Capital Allowances
Research and Development Expenditure Credit 
Creative Sector Tax Reliefs

Corporate taxation in the United Kingdom
Taxation in the United Kingdom